Greta Adami (born 30 July 1992) is an Italian footballer who plays as a midfielder for A.C. Milan and has appeared for the Italy women's national team.

Career
Adami has been capped for the Italy national team, appearing for the team during the 2019 FIFA Women's World Cup qualifying cycle.

References

External links
 
 
 

1992 births
Living people
Italian women's footballers
Italy women's international footballers
Women's association football midfielders
Fiorentina Women's F.C. players
A.C. Milan Women players
People from Viareggio
Footballers from Tuscany
ACF Firenze players
Serie A (women's football) players
Sportspeople from the Province of Lucca